Milton Robert "Milt" Watson (January 10, 1890 – April 10, 1962) nicknamed "Mule", was a Major League Baseball pitcher who played from  to  with the St. Louis Cardinals and the Philadelphia Phillies. He batted and threw right-handed.

He was born in Flovilla, Georgia, and died in Pine Bluff, Arkansas.

Transactions
Milton Watson was traded by the St. Louis Cardinals to the Philadelphia Phillies on April 4, 1918 for Bert Niehoff and $500.

External links

1890 births
1962 deaths
Major League Baseball pitchers
Baseball players from Georgia (U.S. state)
St. Louis Cardinals players
Philadelphia Phillies players
Paris Survivors players
Bartlett (minor league baseball) players